The 1995 Wuding earthquake occurred on October 23, 1995, at 22:46 UTC (October 24, 1995, at 06:46 local time). The epicenter was located near Fenduo Village (芬多村), Fawo Township (发窝乡) of the Wuding County, Yunnan, China. The magnitude of the earthquake was put at  6.2, or  6.5. Fifty-three people were reported dead and 13,903 injured. Many houses and public buildings were damaged, including the Fawo Middle School (发窝中学) and the Fawo Township Office. This earthquake could be felt in southwestern Sichuan.

See also
 List of earthquakes in 1995
List of earthquakes in Yunnan
 List of earthquakes in China

References

External links

1995 earthquakes
Earthquakes in Yunnan
Geography of Chuxiong Yi Autonomous Prefecture